Events from the year 1952 in Romania. After a new trade agreement is signed with the Soviet Union, a new constitution affirms ties with the Communist state, indicated by a red star being added to the coat of arms, emblem and flag.

Incumbents
President of the Provisional Presidium of the Republic: 
 Constantin Ion Parhon (until 3 June).
 Petru Groza (from 3 June)
Prime Minister: 
 Petru Groza (until 2 June)
 Gheorghe Gheorghiu-Dej (from 2 June)
General Secretary of the Romanian Communist Party: Gheorghe Gheorghiu-Dej.

Events
 25 June – Romania signs a trade agreement with the Soviet Union.
 18 July – A proposal for the boundaries of the Magyar Autonomous Region is published.
 29 July – Iosif Sîrbu  wins Romania's first Olympic gold medal in shooting.
 24 September – The Great National Assembly adopts a new  constitution with strong ties to the Soviet Union. A red star is added to the coat of arms, emblem and flag to show the alignment.
 20 November – Parliamentary elections are held. The People's Democratic Front are the only party on the ballot.

Births
 14 January – Mihaela Loghin, shot put medal winner at the 1984 Summer Olympics.
 14 January – Călin Popescu-Tăriceanu, politician, Prime Minister from 2004 to 2008. 
 30 January — Silvia Marcovici, violinist.
 4 March — Florian Pop, mathematician.
 12 March — Gregorian Bivolaru, organization founder.
 31 March — Nelly Miricioiu, operatic soprano.
 21 April — Cristian S. Calude, mathematician.
 5 May – Maia Ciobanu, composer and musicologist.
 30 August – Daniel Dăianu, economist, professor, and politician.
 27 September – Dumitru Prunariu, cosmonaut.

Deaths

 6 February – Ioan Carlaonț, major general in World War II and anti-communist resistance leader, who died at Aiud Prison (born 1885).
 25 February – Stan Ghițescu, politician who died at Sighet Prison (born 1881).
 25 February – Ioan Rășcanu, general during World War I, Minister of War in 1919–1921, who died at Sighet Prison (born 1878).
 11 July – Valeriu Traian Frențiu, bishop of the Romanian Greek Catholic Church, who died at Sighet Prison, beatified on 2 June 2019 (born 1875).
 16 September – Nicolae Păiș, counter-admiral, undersecretary of state, who died at Aiud Prison (born 1887).
 2 October – Mircea Vulcănescu, economist, philosopher and far-right politician, who died at Aiud Prison (born 1904).
 14 November – Ion V. Gruia, jurist and politician, who died at Sighet Prison (born 1895).
 30 November – Barbu Alinescu, major general in World War II (born 1890).

References

Years of the 20th century in Romania
1950s in Romania
1952 in Romania
Romania
Romania